Viktor Ivanovich Nazarov (Russian: Виктор Иванович Назаров; born 18 October 1962) is a Russian businessman and politician. Nazarov served as the 2nd Governor of Omsk Oblast from 2012 through 2017. Prior to his election as governor, he was a member of the Legislative Assembly of Omsk Oblast and the General Director of OmskRegionGaz.

Biography

Viktor Nazarov was born on October 18, 1962 in the village of Ingaly in the Bolsherechensky district of the Omsk region. He graduated from Omsk State University with a degree in law.

In the December 4, 2011 elections, he was elected to the Legislative Assembly of the Omsk Region from the Tukalin Electoral District.

In April 2012, then-Russian President Dimitry Medvedev nominated him to the post of Governor and he was approved by the approved by the Legislative Assembly of Omsk Oblast in May 2012 with 43 for and 1 against his appointment. taking over May 30, 2012. The inauguration took place at the Omsk Academic Drama Theater.   On September 13, 2015, he was re-elected for a new term. Nazarov resigned as governor on October 9, 2017.

References

1962 births
Living people
Governors of Omsk Oblast
United Russia politicians
Members of the Federation Council of Russia (after 2000)